was a Japanese songwriter and jazz pianist.

Biography 
Hachidai Nakamura was born in Tsingtao, Republic of China, to Japanese parents, before moving to Kurume at a young age, where he attended high school. He graduated from Waseda University in Tokyo with a degree in literature. Nakamura extensively played piano during his high school days, where he was invited to perform with local dance band "Yasuhiko Taniguchi and Premier Swing", and "The Red Hat Boys", a student jazz combo.

After Nakamura entered Waseda University, he formed a jazz band named "Big Four" along with Hidehiko Matsumoto, Joji "George" Kawaguchi, and Mitsuru Ono in 1953, but the band was soon disbanded.

As a composer, Nakamura later wrote many songs for various Japanese singers such as Kyu Sakamoto, enka singer Saburō Kitajima, and Johnny & Associates' first group Johnnys. He worked closely with lyricist Rokusuke Ei and many of his songs were popularized by singer Kyu Sakamoto. He wrote the music of the popular Japanese song "Ue o muite arukō," released in 1961 in Japan. The song was released in the United States under the name "Sukiyaki" in 1963, peaking at the number-one position on the Billboard Hot 100. He and Ei also worked on the productions of Johnnys' 1964 debut single "Wakai Namida" and Saburō Kitajima's 1965 single "Kaerokana."

Compositions 

https://www.youtube.com/watch?v=2gkG6DFaDd4&list=RD2gkG6DFaDd4

Kyu Sakamoto 
 Ue o muite arukō (上を向いて歩こう)
 Ashita ga aru sa (明日があるさ)
 Hitoribotchi no futari (一人ぼっちの二人)
 Sayonara sayonara (さよならさよなら)
 Sekai no kuni kara konnichiwa (世界の国からこんにちは)
 Soshite omoide (そして想い出)
 Kuchibue dake ga (口笛だけが)
 Ikite ite yokatta (生きていてよかった)

Johnnys 
 Wakai Namida (若い涙)

Saburō Kitajima 
 Kaerokana (帰ろかな)

References 

1931 births
1992 deaths
Musicians from Qingdao
People from Kurume
Waseda University alumni
Japanese songwriters
Japanese jazz pianists
20th-century pianists
20th-century Japanese musicians